Vilma Åhlström (born 10 November 2000) is a Swedish female curler.

She is a 2019 Swedish mixed curling champion and played at the 2019 World Mixed Curling Championship.

Teams

Women's

Mixed

Mixed doubles

References

External links
 
 

Living people
Swedish female curlers
Swedish curling champions
Place of birth missing (living people)
2000 births
21st-century Swedish women